This is a list of rallies held by Donald Trump, who served as the 45th president of the United States from 2017 to 2021, after his 2016 election, for the 2018 midterms in support of various politicians, for his campaign in the 2020 presidential election, and for the 2022 midterms in support of various politicians.

Thank You Tour

Post-inauguration rallies

2018 midterm rallies

2020 presidential campaign

Pre-2020 campaign rallies

Primary rallies (June 2019–March 2020)

Campaign rallies were temporarily suspended in light of the coronavirus pandemic.

General Election rallies (June 2020–November 2020)

In light of the COVID-19 pandemic, Trump suspended in-person campaign rallies from March 3 through June 19, replacing them with 'tele-rallies'. COVID-19 diagnoses peaked at about 31,000 new cases per day in April. Trump resumed campaign rallies on June 20, at a time when about 25,000 new cases were being diagnosed per day and the rate of new cases was increasing. The daily rate of new COVID-19 diagnoses reached 85,000 cases by Election Day.

Post-election rallies (December 2020–January 2021)

2022 midterm rallies (June 2021–November 2022)

2024 presidential campaign

See also
 List of rallies for the 2016 Donald Trump presidential campaign
 Demonstrations in support of Donald Trump
 Donald Trump 2020 presidential campaign

Notes

References

2017-related lists
2018-related lists
2019-related lists
2020-related lists
Rallies
Rallies, post-election
Lists of events in the United States
Lists of speeches by speaker
Republican Party (United States) events
United States politics-related lists